"Treat Me" is a song by American singer Chlöe. It was released on April 8, 2022, through Parkwood Entertainment.

Background and release
In 2021, Bailey released her debut solo single, "Have Mercy", which reached number one on the Mainstream R&B/Hip-Hop Airplay chart and debuted within the top 40 of the Billboard Hot 100. Bailey provided vocals on "You & Me" by Gunna, from the album DS4Ever before she started to promote her next single. Bailey hinted at the release of "Treat Me" with a promotional video, showing the singer vocalizing in a bodysuit with crystals.

On March 31, 2022, Bailey announced the release date of "Treat Me", stating that the single would come out on April 8, through Parkwood Entertainment. The cover artwork for the song depicts the singer in a latex thong and an up-sized black puffer jacket. Her hair consists of sleek bangs, and she wears jewelry around her neck which goes down to her chest area. The song was Bailey's first release of 2022, and the second single from her upcoming studio album.

Composition
The hook of "Treat Me" contains a sample from "Ms. New Booty", a 2005 song by Bubba Sparxxx and the Ying Yang Twins. The song was produced by Oak. Bailey wrote "Treat Me" while in the process of exiting a relationship. The song contains themes of pride and power.

Music video
The music video for "Treat Me", directed by Diana Kunst, begins with Bailey standing in the middle of the frame, wearing a leather suit as lights flash in the background. After this, the singer dances beside a leopard. The video is inspired by Grace Jones and Janet Jackson. William Ylvisaker and Lukas van der Fecht designed some of the outfits used in the clip. The video's production was handled by Christopher Lopez. The executive producers are Justin Benoliel, Amanda Leya Andrews, and Jill Kaplan. Creative direction is provided by Andrew Makadsi of Parkwood.

Credits
Credits adapted from Spotify.

 Chloe Bailey – performer, songwriter
 Warren Felder – songwriter, producer
 Keith Sorrells – songwriter
 Caroline Ailin – songwriter
 Deonjelo Holmes – songwriter
 Eric Jackson – songwriter
 Michael Crooms – songwriter
 Warren Mathis – songwriter

Charts

References

2022 songs
Chloe Bailey songs
Songs written by Chloe Bailey
Songs written by Oak Felder
Songs written by Keith Sorrells
Songs written by Caroline Ailin
Songs written by Mr. Collipark